The 2021 Lebanese Super Cup was the 21st Lebanese Super Cup, an annual football match played between the winners of the previous season's Lebanese Premier League and Lebanese FA Cup. As Ansar won both competitions in 2021, their opponents were the 2020–21 league runners-up Nejmeh.

The match was played at the Fouad Chehab Stadium on 7 August 2021. Ansar won their sixth title, defeating rivals Nejmeh on penalties, following a 2–2 draw after regular time.

Match

Summary
Mahdi Zein of Nejmeh opened the scoring in the 39th minute, assisted by Khalil Bader. In the 42nd minute, Nejmeh were close to doubling the lead through a free kick by Khaled Takaji, which was saved by Ansar's goalkeeper Nazih Assaad. In the second half, despite Ansar coming close to scoring the equalizer, Nejmeh made it 2–0 in the 59th minute thanks to Takaji's goal. In the 68th minute, Ahmad Hijazi of Ansar reduced the deficit, scoring a backheel goal via a pass from Hassan Maatouk. Ansar equalized in stoppage time, after Jihad Ayoub scored in the fourth minute of added time. The game went directly to a penalty shoot-out; after Ansar scored all five of their penalties, Nejmeh's fifth penalty, taken by Mohamad Ghaddar, was saved by Assaad: Ansar were crowned Super Cup champions for the sixth time.

Details

See also 
 Beirut derby

References 

Lebanese Super Cup
Super Cup
Super Cup
Super Cup
2021 in Lebanese sport 
Super Cup